VH1 Behind the Music: The Harry Chapin Collection is a posthumously produced compilation album by the American singer-songwriter Harry Chapin. It was released in 2001 for the TV series, Behind the Music. The album features some of Chapin's biggest hit singles.

Behind the Music
Behind the Music, a TV series airing on VH1, compiled all of the songs into the life story of Chapin. Some songs are live versions with videos.

Reception

Stephen Thomas Erlewine warns that "Chapin's work can seem strident and didactic" but calls this collection "a very good compilation of his greatest moments" and "better balanced than a lot of hits compilations".

Track listing

References

2001 compilation albums
Harry Chapin albums
Compilation albums published posthumously